Howard is a census-designated place and unincorporated community in Taylor County, Georgia, United States. Its population was 50 as of the 2020 census. Howard has a post office with ZIP code 31039. Georgia State Route 96 passes through the community.

Demographics

References

Populated places in Taylor County, Georgia
Census-designated places in Georgia (U.S. state)